Trimethylolethane triglycidyl ether (TMETGE) is an organic chemical in the glycidyl ether family. It has the formula C14H24O6 and the IUPAC name is 2-({2-methyl-3-[(oxiran-2-yl)methoxy]-2-{[(oxiran-2-yl)methoxy]methyl}propoxy}methyl)oxirane. The CAS number is 68460-21-9. A key use is as a modifier for epoxy resins as a reactive diluent.

Alternative names

 Trimethylolethane,chloromethyloxirane polymer
 Trimethylolethane triglycidyl ether
 1,3-Propanediol,2-(hydroxymethyl)-2-methyl-,polymer with (chloromethyl)oxirane
 1,3-Propanediol,2-(hydroxymethyl)-2-methyl-,polymer with 2-(chloromethyl)oxirane
 2-(hydroxymethyl)-2-methylpropane-1,3-diol-2-(chloromethyl)oxirane (1:1)

Manufacture
Trimethylolethane and epichlorohydrin are reacted with a Lewis acid catalyst to form a halohydrin. The next step is dehydrochlorination with sodium hydroxide. This forms the triglycidyl ether. Waste products are sodium chloride, water and excess sodium hydroxide (alkaline brine).

Uses
As the molecule has 3 oxirane functionalities, a key use is modifying and reducing the viscosity of epoxy resins but giving higher functionality. These reactive diluent modified epoxy resins may then be further formulated into CASE applications: Coatings, Adhesives, Sealants, and Elastomers. The use of the diluent does effect mechanical properties and microstructure of epoxy resins. It produces epoxy coatings with high impact resistance The molecule has been used to synthesize other molecules.

See also
 Epoxide
 Glycidol

References

Further reading
 
 
 
 
 </ref>

External websites
 Hexion Poly-functional Modifiers 
 Denacol epoxy diluent range
 Cargill Reactive diluents
    GE31_Technical Data Sheet 

Glycidyl ethers
Reactive diluents